is a Japanese voice actress affiliated with Haikyo.

Filmography

Anime

Film

Video games

References

External links 
  
 

Living people
Voice actresses from Kanagawa Prefecture
Japanese voice actresses
Japanese video game actresses
1992 births
21st-century Japanese actresses
Tokyo Actor's Consumer's Cooperative Society voice actors